The 2013–14 Turkish Women's Volleyball League is the 31st edition of the top-flight professional women's volleyball league in Turkey.

Regular season

League table

Source: Turkish Volleyball Federation

Play-out

Playoffs 

Source: Turkish Volleyball Federation

Individual awards

References

External links 
Turkish Volleyball Federation official web page

2013 in Turkish sport
2014 in Turkish sport
2013 in Turkish women's sport
2014 in Turkish women's sport
Turkish Women's Volleyball League seasons